The mottle-faced tamarin (Saguinus inustus) is a species of tamarin from South America. It is found in Brazil and Colombia.

Interaction With Humans 
Mottle-faced tamarins are not hunted by locals, due to their "small size" and instead some are even kept as pets.

References

mottle-faced tamarin
Mammals of Brazil
Mammals of Colombia
mottle-faced tamarin